Brody is a city in Ukraine.

Brody may also refer to:

People
Brody (name), a common family name and given name
Jorge Campos (born 1966), Mexican retired footballer nicknamed "El Brody"

Places
Brody, Kielce County in Świętokrzyszkie Voivodeship (south-central Poland)
Brody, Końskie County in Świętokrzyszkie Voivodeship (south-central Poland)
Brody, Kuyavian-Pomeranian Voivodeship (north-central Poland)
Brody, Lesser Poland Voivodeship (south Poland)
Brody, Łódź Voivodeship (central Poland)
Brody, Nowy Dwór Mazowiecki County in Masovian Voivodeship (east-central Poland)
Brody, Nowy Tomyśl County in Greater Poland Voivodeship (west-central Poland)
Brody, Płońsk County in Masovian Voivodeship (east-central Poland)
Brody, Podlaskie Voivodeship (north-east Poland)
Brody, Pomeranian Voivodeship (north Poland)
Brody, Radom County in Masovian Voivodeship (south Poland)
Brody, Starachowice County in Świętokrzyszkie Voivodeship (south-central Poland)
Brody, Staszów County in Świętokrzyszkie Voivodeship (south-central Poland)
Brody, Turek County in Greater Poland Voivodeship (west-central Poland)
Brody, Żary County in Lubusz Voivodeship (west Poland)
Brody, Zielona Góra County in Lubusz Voivodeship (west Poland)

Other uses
Brody (air base), near Brody, Ukraine
Brody Castle, near Brody, Ukraine
Brody School of Medicine at East Carolina University, United States
Brody Complex, a set of residential buildings at Michigan State University, United States
Brody Museum of History and District Ethnography, in Brody, Ukraine
Battle of Brody (disambiguation), four 19th and 20th century battles in the vicinity of Brody, Ukraine
Brody's, a defunct fashion merchandising chain in North Carolina, United States
Brody the Bear, a bear actor

See also
Brodie (disambiguation)